Mairzee Almas is a Canadian filmmaker and television director from Vancouver. She has directed numerous TV shows, including Shadow and Bone, Y The Last Man, The Sandman, Locke & Key, Outlander, Impulse, Jessica Jones and 12 Monkeys amongst many others. Her directing work encompasses SVOD, Cable and Network outlets. She was also the Co-Executive Producer/Director for the second season of Impulse.
Mairzee began her career as an actress, having trained at F.T.S. Performing Arts Conservatory in Vancouver. 
She then trained at the Vancouver Film School - graduating from their Foundation Film Program. Over the next several years, she advanced to become a sought after First AD, working on numerous film and television projects. 
Her first directing opportunities came with episodes of Smallville and Da Vinci's Inquest. Since then, she has directed over 70 episodes of television and been nominated for multiple directing awards.
She lives in Vancouver and works all around the world.

Filmography 
The Sandman
Locke & Key
Y The Last Man
Shadow and Bone
Outlander
Jessica Jones
Midnight, Texas
Iron Fist
Impulse
Guilt
Ascension (miniseries)
The 100
Smallville
Lost Girl
Beauty & the Beast
Being Human
iZombie
Alphas
Haven
Defiance
Motive
12 Monkeys
Supergirl
Arrow
Legends of Tomorrow
Another Life
Batwoman

References

External links

Canadian television directors
Canadian women television directors
Living people
Place of birth missing (living people)
Year of birth missing (living people)